Blacken is a basin in Lake Mälaren, the third-largest lake in Sweden.  It is located in the western portion of the lake.

References

Mälaren